K-68 was a "Project 651" diesel–electric submarine built for the Soviet Navy during the 1960s. Commissioned in 1965, the boat was armed with long-range cruise missiles to carry out its mission of destroying American aircraft carriers and bases. The missiles could be fitted with either conventional or nuclear warheads. While much of the submarine's activities during the Cold War are unknown, she did make at least one patrol in the Mediterranean Sea before serving as the test bed for an auxiliary nuclear reactor from 1976 to 1991. K-68 was decommissioned in 1992 and subsequently scrapped.

Background and description
In the late 1950s, the Soviet Navy was tasked to neutralize American bases and aircraft carriers. It began construction of a large number of expensive nuclear-powered (s) to accomplish this, but could not build enough nuclear reactors to equip them in a timely manner. Even though the Juliett class was inferior to the Echos, it was ordered into production because it did not require resources needed for the nuclear boats.

The Juliett-class boats are a double-hulled design that displaces  on the surface and  submerged. Unlike the later submarines of the class, K-68s hull was not covered with anechoic tiles. The prominent blast deflectors cut out of the outer hull behind the missile launchers make the submarines very noisy at high speed. Their crew numbered 78 men.

Propulsion and performance
The Juliett class is powered by a diesel-electric system that consists of two  1D43 diesel engines and a pair of  MG-141 electric motors for cruising on the surface. Two additional  electric motors are intended for slow speeds underwater and are powered by four banks of lead-acid battery cells that are recharged by a  1DL42 diesel generator. The boats are fitted with a retractable snorkel to allow the diesel engines to operate while underwater.

They could carry enough supplies for 90 days of operation.

Armament
To carry out the Julietts' mission of destroying American carrier battle groups and bases, they were fitted with two pairs of missile launchers, one each fore and aft of the sail. The launchers were used by the surface-launched SS-N-3 Shaddock family of long-range, turbojet-powered, cruise missiles. The P-5D version was codenamed SS-N-3c by NATO and was a dedicated land-attack missile that could be equipped with either a high-explosive or nuclear warhead; it was withdrawn from service in 1965–1966. The P-6 (SS-N-3a) variant was a radar-guided anti-ship missile that could also be fitted with high-explosive and nuclear warheads.
 
The more traditional armament of the Julietts consisted of six  torpedo tubes mounted in the bow and four  torpedo tubes in the stern. Due to space limitations, no reloads were provided for the bow tubes, but each stern tube had two reloads for a total of twelve.

Fire control and sensors

The submarines relied upon aircraft for their long-range anti-ship targeting which they received via the Uspekh-U datalink system. Their own Argument missile-guidance radar (NATO reporting name: Front Door) controlled the P-6 missiles until they were out of range via a datalink codenamed Front Piece. The missiles' onboard radar would detect the targets and transmit an image back to the submarine via video datalink so the crew could select which target to attack, after which the missile relied upon its own radar for terminal guidance. The Argument radar has a massive antenna that was stowed at the front of the sail and rotated 180° for use. The Front Piece antenna was mounted on top of the Argument antenna.

The boats are fitted with Artika-M (MG-200) and Herkules (MG-15) sonars, Feniks-M (MG-10) and MG-13 hydrophones and a Albatros RLK-50 search radar (NATO reporting name: Snoop Tray). They are also equipped with a Nakat-M Electronic warfare support measures system.

Construction and career 
K-68 was laid down at the Krasnoye Sormovo Factory No. 112 shipyard in Gorky on 25 January 1962. She was launched on 6 February 1964 and commissioned on 22 January 1965 into the 35th Submarine Division of the Northern Fleet. The details of K-68s career remain largely unknown, although the boat made a nine-month-long patrol in the Mediterranean Sea in 1974–1975. On 25 September 1976 K-68 began a lengthy conversion at Gorky that lasted until December 1985 which installed a prototype  VAU-6 auxiliary nuclear reactor. Designed by the Lazurit Central Design Bureau under the designation of Project 651E, the installation was intended to extend the submarine's underwater endurance. B-68 was assigned to the Northern Fleet's 7th Division of Submarines for sea trials that lasted until 1991. B-68 was redesignated as BS-68 on 19 April 1990. Although there were difficulties early in the test program, it was ultimately successful, but the collapse of the Soviet Union in 1991 halted further work. The submarine was decommissioned and transferred to the 346th Submarine Brigade on 3 July 1992 for disposal and subsequently scrapped.

References

Bibliography
 

Juliett-class submarines
Ships built in the Soviet Union
1963 ships
Cold War submarines of the Soviet Union